First on Mars may refer to:

First on Mars (website), a web application that aggregates links to cable and network TV shows
No Man Friday, a British science fiction novel known in the USA as First on Mars